Espace 3000 is an indoor sporting arena located in Hyères, France.  The capacity of the arena is 2,500 people.  It is currently home to the Hyères-Toulon Var Basket basketball team.

Indoor arenas in France
Basketball venues in France
Sports venues in Var (department)